The Magellan spacecraft was a  robotic space probe launched by NASA of the United States, on May 4, 1989, to map the surface of Venus by using synthetic-aperture radar and to measure the planetary gravitational field.

The Magellan probe was the first interplanetary mission to be launched from the Space Shuttle, the first one to use the Inertial Upper Stage booster, and the first spacecraft to test aerobraking as a method for circularizing its orbit. Magellan was the fifth successful NASA mission to Venus, and it ended an eleven-year gap in U.S. interplanetary probe launches.

History
Beginning in the late 1970s, scientists advocated for a radar mapping mission to Venus. They first sought to construct a spacecraft named the Venus Orbiting Imaging Radar (VOIR), but it became clear that the mission would be beyond the budget constraints during the ensuing years. The VOIR mission was canceled in 1982.

A simplified radar mission proposal was recommended by the Solar System Exploration Committee, and this one was submitted and accepted as the Venus Radar Mapper program in 1983. The proposal included a limited focus and a single primary scientific instrument. In 1985, the mission was renamed Magellan, in honor of the sixteenth-century Portuguese explorer Ferdinand Magellan, known for his exploration, mapping, and circumnavigation of the Earth.

The objectives of the mission included:
(primary)
 Obtain a near-global topographic map with  spatial and  vertical resolution.
 Obtain near-global gravity field data with  resolution and two to three milligals of accuracy.
 Develop an understanding of the geological structure of the planet, including its density distribution and dynamics.

Spacecraft design

The spacecraft was designed and built by the Martin Marietta Company, and the Jet Propulsion Laboratory (JPL) managed the mission for NASA. Elizabeth Beyer served as the program manager and Joseph Boyce served as the lead program scientist for the NASA headquarters. For JPL, Douglas Griffith served as the Magellan project manager and R. Stephen Saunders served as the lead project scientist. Hughes Aircraft Company's Space and Communications Group designed and built the spacecraft's synthetic aperture radar.

To save costs, most of the Magellan probe was made up of flight spare parts and reused design elements from other spacecraft:

Reuse Type Legend 

The main body of the spacecraft, a spare one from the Voyager missions, was a 10-sided aluminum bus, containing the computers, data recorders, and other subsystems. The spacecraft measured 6.4 meters tall and 4.6 meters in diameter. Overall, the spacecraft weighed 3,445 kilograms.

Attitude control and propulsion

The spacecraft's attitude control (orientation) was designed to be three-axis stabilized, including during the firing of the Star 48B solid rocket motor (SRM) used to place it into orbit around Venus. Prior to Magellan, all spacecraft SRM firings had involved spinning spacecraft, which made control of the SRM a much easier task. In a typical spin mode, any unwanted forces related to SRM or nozzle mis-alignments are cancelled out. In the case of Magellan, the spacecraft design did not lend itself to spinning, so the resulting propulsion system design had to accommodate the challenging control issues with the large Star 48B SRM. The Star 48B, containing 2,014 kg of solid propellant, developed a thrust of ~89 kN (20,000 lbf) shortly after firing; therefore, even a 0.5% SRM alignment error could generate side forces of 445 N (100 lbf). Final conservative estimates of worst-case side forces resulted in the need for eight 445 N thrusters, two in each quadrant, located out on booms at the maximum radius that the Space Shuttle Orbiter Payload Bay would accommodate (4.4-m or 14.5-ft diameter).

The actual propulsion system design consisted of a total of 24 monopropellant hydrazine thrusters fed from a single 71 cm (28 in) diameter titanium tank. The tank contained 133 kg (293 lb) of purified hydrazine. The design also included a pyrotechnically-isolated external high pressure tank with additional helium that could be connected to the main tank prior to the critical Venus orbit insertion burn to ensure maximum thrust from the 445 N thrusters during the SRM firing. Other hardware regarding orientation of the spacecraft consists of a set of gyroscopes and a star scanner.

Communications

For communications, the spacecraft included a lightweight graphite/aluminum, 3.7-meter high-gain antenna left over from the Voyager Program and a medium-gain antenna spare from the Mariner 9 mission. A low-gain antenna attached to the high-gain antenna was also included for contingencies. When communicating with the Deep Space Network, the spacecraft was able to simultaneously receive commands at 1.2 kilobits/second in the S-band and transmit data at 268.8 kilobits/second in the X-band.

Power
Magellan was powered by two square solar arrays, each measuring 2.5 meters across. Together, the arrays supplied 1,200 watts of power at the beginning of the mission. However, over the course of the mission the solar arrays gradually degraded due to frequent, extreme temperature changes. To power the spacecraft while occulted from the Sun, twin 30 amp-hour, 26-cell, nickel-cadmium batteries were included. The batteries recharged as the spacecraft received direct sunlight.

Computers and data processing
The computing system on the spacecraft was partially modified equipment from the Galileo. There were two ATAC-16 computers forming one redundant system, located in the attitude-control subsystem, and four RCA 1802 microprocessors, as two redundant systems, to control the command and data subsystem (CDS). The CDS was able to store commands for up to three days, and also to autonomously control the spacecraft if problems were to arise while mission operators were not in contact with the spacecraft.

For storing the commands and recorded data, the spacecraft also included two multitrack digital tape recorders, able to store up to 225 megabytes of data until contact with the Earth was restored and the tapes were played back.

Scientific instruments

Thick and opaque, the atmosphere of Venus required a method beyond optical survey, to map the surface of the planet. The resolution of conventional radar depends entirely on the size of the antenna, which is greatly restricted by costs, physical constraints by launch vehicles and the complexity of maneuvering a large apparatus to provide high resolution data. Magellan addressed this problem by using a method known as synthetic aperture, where a large antenna is imitated by processing the information gathered by ground computers.

The Magellan high-gain parabolic antenna, oriented 28°–78° to the right or left of nadir, emitted thousands of microwave pulses per second that passed through the clouds and to the surface of Venus, illuminating a swath of land. The Radar System then recorded the brightness of each pulse as it reflected back off the side surfaces of rocks, cliffs, volcanoes and other geologic features, as a form of backscatter. To increase the imaging resolution, Magellan recorded a series of data bursts for a particular location during multiple instances called, "looks". Each "look" slightly overlapped the previous, returning slightly different information for the same location, as the spacecraft moved in orbit. After transmitting the data back to Earth, Doppler modeling was used to take the overlapping "looks" and combine them into a continuous, high resolution image of the surface.

Other science
In addition to the radar data, Magellan collected several other types of scientific measurements. These included detailed measurements of the Venus gravitational field, measurements of the atmospheric density, and radio occultation data on the atmospheric profile.

Gallery

Mission profile

Launch and trajectory

Magellan was launched on May 4, 1989, at 18:46:59 UTC by the National Aeronautics and Space Administration from KSC Launch Complex 39B at the Kennedy Space Center in Florida, aboard Space Shuttle Atlantis during mission STS-30. Once in orbit, the Magellan and its attached Inertial Upper Stage booster were deployed from Atlantis and launched on May 5, 1989 01:06:00 UTC, sending the spacecraft into a Type IV heliocentric orbit where it would circle the Sun 1.5 times, before reaching Venus 15 months later on August 10, 1990.

Originally, the Magellan had been scheduled for launch in 1988 with a trajectory lasting six months. However, due to the Space Shuttle Challenger disaster in 1986, several missions, including Galileo and Magellan, were deferred until shuttle flights resumed in September 1988. Magellan was planned to be launched with a liquid-fueled, Centaur G upper-stage booster, carried in the cargo bay of the Space Shuttle. However, the entire Centaur G program was canceled after the Challenger disaster, and the Magellan probe had to be modified to be attached to the less-powerful Inertial Upper Stage. The next best opportunity for launching occurred in October 1989.

Further complicating the launch however, was the launching of the Galileo mission to Jupiter, one that included a fly-by of Venus. Intended for launch in 1986, the pressures to ensure a launch for Galileo in 1989, mixed with a short launch-window necessitating a mid-October launch, resulted in replanning the Magellan mission. Wary of rapid shuttle launches, the decision was made to launch Magellan in May, and into an orbit that would require one year, three months, before encountering Venus.

Orbital encounter of Venus

On August 10, 1990, Magellan encountered Venus and began the orbital insertion maneuver which placed the spacecraft into a three-hour, nine minute, elliptical orbit that brought the spacecraft 295-kilometers from the surface at about 10 degrees North during the periapsis and out to 7762-kilometers during apoapsis.

During each orbit, the space probe captured radar data while the spacecraft was closest to the surface, and then transmit it back to Earth as it moved away from Venus. This maneuver required extensive use of the reaction wheels to rotate the spacecraft as it imaged the surface for 37-minutes and as it pointed toward Earth for two hours. The primary mission intended for the spacecraft to return images of at least 70 percent of the surface during one Venusian day, which lasts 243 Earth days as the planet slowly spins. To avoid overly-redundant data at the highest and lowest latitudes, the Magellan probe alternated between a Northern-swath, a region designated as 90 degrees north latitude to 54 degrees south latitude, and a Southern-swath, designated as 76 degrees north latitude to 68 degrees south latitude. However, due to periapsis being 10 degrees north of the equatorial line, imaging the South Pole region was unlikely.

Mapping cycle 1
Goal: Complete primary objective.
September 15, 1990 – May 15, 1991

The primary mission began on September 15, 1990, with the intention to provide a "left-looking" map of 70% of the Venusian surface at a minimum resolution of 1-kilometer/pixel. During cycle 1, the altitude of the spacecraft varied from 2000-kilometers at the north pole, to 290-kilometers near periapsis. Upon completion during May 15, 1991, having made 1,792 orbits, Magellan had mapped approximately 83.7% of the surface with a resolution between 101 and 250-meters/pixel.

Mission extension

Mapping cycle 2
Goal: Image the south pole region and gaps from Cycle 1.
May 15, 1991 – January 14, 1992

Beginning immediately after the end of cycle 1, cycle 2 was intended to provide data for the existing gaps in the map collected during first cycle, including a large portion of the southern hemisphere. To do this, Magellan had to be reoriented, changing the gathering method to "right-looking". Upon completion during mid-January 1992, cycle 2 provided data for 54.5% of the surface, and combined with the previous cycle, a map containing 96% of the surface could be constructed.

Mapping cycle 3
Goal: Fill remaining gaps and collect stereo imagery.
January 15, 1992 – September 13, 1992

Immediately after cycle 2, cycle 3 began collecting data for stereo imagery on the surface that would later allow the ground team to construct, clear, three-dimensional renderings of the surface. Approximately 21.3% of the surface was imaged in stereo by the end of the cycle on September 13, 1992, increasing the overall coverage of the surface to 98%.

Mapping cycle 4
Goal: Measure Venus' gravitational field.
September 14, 1992 – May 23, 1993

Upon completing cycle 3, Magellan ceased imaging the surface. Instead, beginning mid-September 1992, the Magellan maintained pointing of the high-gain antenna toward Earth where the Deep Space Network began recording a constant stream of telemetry. This constant signal allowed the DSN to collect information on the gravitational field of Venus by monitoring the velocity of the spacecraft. Areas of higher gravitation would slightly increase the velocity of the spacecraft, registering as a Doppler shift in the signal. The space craft completed 1,878 orbits until completion of the cycle on May 23, 1993; a loss of data at the beginning of the cycle necessitated an additional 10 days of gravitational study.

Mapping cycle 5
Goal: Aerobraking to circular orbit and global gravity measurements.
May 24, 1993 – August 29, 1994

At the end of the fourth cycle in May 1993, the orbit of Magellan was circularized using a technique known as aerobraking. The circularized orbit allowed a much higher resolution of gravimetric data to be acquired when cycle 5 began on August 3, 1993. The spacecraft performed 2,855 orbits and provided high-resolution gravimetric data for 94% of the planet, before the end of the cycle on August 29, 1994.

Aerobraking
Goal: To enter a circular orbitMay 24, 1993 – August 2, 1993Aerobraking had long been sought as a method for slowing the orbit of interplanetary spacecraft. Previous suggestions included the need for aeroshells that proved too complicated and expensive for most missions. Testing a new approach to the method, a plan was devised to drop the orbit of Magellan into the outermost region of the Venusian atmosphere. Slight friction on the spacecraft slowed the velocity over a period, slightly longer than two months, bringing the spacecraft into an approximately circular orbit with periapse altitude at 180 km and apoapse altitude at 540 km, down from an apoapse altitude at 8467 km. The method has since been used extensively on later interplanetary missions.

Mapping cycle 6Goal: Collect high-resolution gravity data and conduct radio science experiments.April 16, 1994 – October 13, 1994

The sixth and final orbiting cycle was another extension to the two previous gravimetric studies. Toward the end of the cycle, a final experiment was conducted, known as the "Windmill" experiment to provide data on the composition of the upper atmosphere of Venus. Magellan performed 1,783 orbits before the end of the cycle on October 13, 1994, when the spacecraft entered the atmosphere and disintegrated.

Windmill experiment
Goal: Collect data on atmospheric dynamics.
September 6, 1994 – September 14, 1994

In September 1994, the orbit of Magellan was lowered to begin the "Windmill experiment". During the experiment, the spacecraft was oriented with the solar arrays broadly perpendicular to the orbital path, where they could act as paddles as they impacted molecules of the upper-Venusian atmosphere. Countering this force, the thrusters fired to keep the spacecraft from spinning. This provided data on the basic oxygen gas-surface interaction. This was useful for understanding the impact of upper-atmospheric forces which aided in designing future Earth-orbiting satellites, and methods for aerobraking during future planetary spacecraft missions.

Results

Study of the Magellan high-resolution global images is providing evidence to better understand Venusian geology and the role of impacts, volcanism, and tectonics in the formation of Venusian surface structures.
The surface of Venus is mostly covered by volcanic materials. Volcanic surface features, such as vast lava plains, fields of small lava domes, and large shield volcanoes are common.
There are few impact craters on Venus, suggesting that the surface is, in general, geologically young - less than 800 million years old.
The presence of lava channels over 6,000 kilometers long suggests river-like flows of extremely low-viscosity lava that probably erupted at a high rate.
Large pancake-shaped volcanic domes suggest the presence of a type of lava produced by extensive evolution of crustal rocks.
The typical signs of terrestrial plate tectonics - continental drift and basin floor spreading - are not evident on Venus. The planet's tectonics is dominated by a system of global rift zones and numerous broad, low domical structures called coronae, produced by the upwelling and subsidence of magma from the mantle.
Although Venus has a dense atmosphere, the surface reveals no evidence of substantial wind erosion, and only evidence of limited wind transport of dust and sand. This contrasts with Mars, where there is a thin atmosphere, but substantial evidence of wind erosion and transport of dust and sand.

Magellan created the first (and currently the best) near-photographic quality, high resolution radar mapping of the planet's surface features. Prior Venus missions had created low resolution radar globes of general, continent-sized formations. Magellan, however, finally allowed detailed imaging and analysis of craters, hills, ridges, and other geologic formations, to a degree comparable to the visible-light photographic mapping of other planets. Magellan's global radar map currently remains as the most detailed Venus map in existence, although the upcoming NASA VERITAS and Roskosmos Venera-D probes will carry a radar that can achieve a much higher resolution compared to the radar used by Magellan. Both probes are expected to launch in 2029.

Scientists
The Magellan project was set up so that the initial images and data from the Magellan probe were only for use and study by a team of principal investigators from a variety of universities and institutions, and by the Magellan Project Science Team. These scientists were responsible for validating the data, contributing input for spacecraft acquisition of data, and interpreting the data results for their release to the public. Data was shared with three visiting Soviet scientists (Alexander Basilevsky, Effaim Akim and Alexander Zacharov), a first, and sensitive issue, for NASA at the time considering the Cold War was just coming to a close.

The Magellan Project Science room became notorious for its hanging of long thermal print strips of image data (FBIDRs) along the walls of a spacious room. This was the first form in which the imagery of the surface of Venus was seen due to the long, narrow swathes acquired by the spacecraft. Significant guests during the mission's operation included Margaret Thatcher.

After the initial investigation stage Magellan's full data set was released for public consumption.

Project Science Team
The Magellan Project Science Team consisted of Dr. R. Stephen Saunders, the Project Scientist; Dr. Ellen Stofan, the Deputy Project Scientist; research assistants Tim Parker, Dr. Jeff Plaut, and Annette deCharon; and Project Science Aide, Gregory Michaels.

Other Magellan scientists were involved with the mission's science including principal investigators and three visiting Soviet scientists.

End of mission

On September 9, 1994, a press release outlined the termination of the Magellan mission. Due to the degradation of the power output from the solar arrays and onboard components, and having completed all objectives successfully, the mission was to end in mid-October. The termination sequence began in late August 1994, with a series of orbital trim maneuvers which lowered the spacecraft into the outermost layers of the Venusian atmosphere to allow the Windmill experiment to begin on September 6, 1994. The experiment lasted for two weeks and was followed by subsequent orbital trim maneuvers, further lowering the altitude of the spacecraft for the final termination phase.

On October 11, 1994, moving at a velocity of 7 kilometers/second, the final orbital trim maneuver was performed, placing the spacecraft 139.7 kilometers above the surface, well within the atmosphere. At this altitude the spacecraft encountered sufficient ram pressure to raise temperatures on the solar arrays to 126 degrees Celsius.

On October 13, 1994 at 10:05:00 UTC, communication was lost when the spacecraft entered radio occultation behind Venus. The team continued to listen for another signal from the spacecraft until 18:00:00 UTC, when the mission was determined to have concluded. Although much of Magellan was expected to vaporize due to atmospheric stresses, some amount of wreckage is thought have hit the surface by 20:00:00 UTC.

Communication with the Magellan spacecraft was lost early Wednesday morning, following an aggressive series of five Orbit Trim Maneuvers (OTMs) on Tuesday, October 11, which took the orbit down into the upper atmosphere of Venus. The Termination experiment (extension of September "Windmill" experiment) design was expected to result in final loss of the spacecraft due to a negative power margin. This was not a problem since spacecraft power would have been too low to sustain operations in the next few weeks due to continuing solar cell loss.

Thus, a final controlled experiment was designed to maximize mission return. This final, low altitude was necessary to study the effects of a carbon dioxide atmosphere.

The final OTM took the periapsis to  where the sensible drag on the spacecraft was very evident. The solar panel temperatures rose to 126 deg. C. and the attitude control system fired all available Y-axis thrusters to counteract the torques. However, attitude control was maintained to the end.

The main bus voltage dropped to 24.7 volts after five orbits, and it was predicted that attitude control would be lost if the power dropped below 24 volts. It was decided to enhance the Windmill experiment by changing the panel angles for the remaining orbits. This was also a preplanned experiment option.

At this point, the spacecraft was expected to survive only two orbits.

Magellan continued to maintain communication for three more orbits, even though the power continued to drop below 23 volts and eventually reached 20.4 volts. At this time, one battery went off-line, and the spacecraft was defined as power starved.

Communication was lost at 3:02 am PDT just as Magellan was about to enter an Earth occultation on orbit 15032. Contact was not re-established. Tracking operations were continued to 11:00 am but no signal was seen, and none was expected. The spacecraft should land on Venus by 1:00 pm PDT Thursday, October 13, 1994.

See also

 List of missions to Venus
 Venus Express
 Venera 15
 Venera 16

References

External links
Magellan homepage
Magellan mission description and data
Magellan images
Magellan Mission Profile by NASA's Solar System Exploration
https://web.archive.org/web/20070126122448/http://library.thinkquest.org/J0112188/magellan_probe.htm
NASA Space Science Data Coordinated Archive

Missions to Venus
NASA space probes
Destroyed space probes
Orbiters (space probe)
Spacecraft launched by the Space Shuttle
Spacecraft launched in 1989
Space radars
Space synthetic aperture radar
Space radar altimeters
Articles containing video clips